The 52 members of the Parliament of Vanuatu from 2016 to 2020 were elected on 22 January 2016.

List of members

References

 2020